Munich-Solln station is a Munich S-Bahn railway station on the Bayerische Oberlandbahn main line in the borough of Solln.

German businessman Dominik Brunner was murdered at this station on 12 September 2009 while trying to protect a group of young teenagers from a gang of thugs.

References

Solln
Solln